Ruslan Zanevskyi (born 27 November 1987 in Odessa, Ukrainian SSR) is a professional Ukrainian football offensive midfielder.

Career
Tkachuk is the product of Junga Chorne More Odessa and FC Shakhtar Donetsk Youth Sportive School. Zanevsky began his career in 2004 for the Shakhtar Donetsk. In the end of 2005, by mutual consent he canceled the contract with Donetsk club and then training together with the reserve team players AC Milan, then in 2006 he was sent into Serie D farm club Nuorese Calcio. Then he played in clubs Ditton Daugavpils, R. Charleroi S.C., FF Jaro, Jakobstads BK and FC Poltava.

International career
He played for the Ukraine national under-17 football team and Ukraine national under-19 football team.

References

External links
Profile at FFU Official Site (Ukr)

1987 births
Living people
Ukrainian footballers
FC Shakhtar-3 Donetsk players
FC Shakhtar-2 Donetsk players
FC Daugava players
Latvian Higher League players
R. Charleroi S.C. players
Belgian Pro League players
FF Jaro players
Veikkausliiga players
FC Poltava players
Expatriate footballers in Finland
Expatriate footballers in Italy
Expatriate footballers in Belgium
Expatriate footballers in Latvia
Ukrainian expatriate footballers
Ukrainian expatriate sportspeople in Finland
Ukrainian expatriate sportspeople in Italy
Ukrainian expatriate sportspeople in Belgium
Ukrainian expatriate sportspeople in Latvia
Association football midfielders
Jakobstads BK players
Footballers from Odesa